Austria competed at the 1988 Summer Olympics in Seoul, South Korea. 73 competitors, 66 men and 7 women, took part in 62 events in 17 sports.

Medalists

Competitors
The following is the list of number of competitors in the Games.

Athletics

Men's Long Jump 
 Andreas Steiner 
 Qualification — 7.61m (→ did not advance)
 Teddy Steinmayr 
 Qualification — 7.36m (→ did not advance)

Men's Shot Put
 Klaus Bodenmüller
 Qualifying Heat – 18.89m (→ did not advance)

Men's Hammer Throw
 Johann Lindner
 Qualifying Heat — 76.60m
 Final — 75.36m (→ 10th place)

Men's Decathlon 
 Georg Werthner — 7753 points (→ 21st place) 
 100 metres — 11.52s
 Long Jump — 7.36m
 Shot Put — 13.93m
 High Jump — 1.94m
 400 metres — 49.99s
 110m Hurdles — 15.64s
 Discus Throw — 38.82m
 Pole Vault — 4.60m
 Javelin Throw — 67.04m
 1.500 metres — 4:26.42s

Boxing

Cycling

Seven cyclists, all men, represented Austria in 1988.

Men's road race
 Mario Traxl
 Johann Lienhart
 Dietmar Hauer

Men's team time trial
 Dietmar Hauer
 Norbert Kostel
 Johann Lienhart
 Mario Traxl

Men's team pursuit
 Roland Königshofer
 Johann Lienhart
 Kurt Schmied
 Franz Stocher

Men's points race
 Roland Königshofer

Diving

Equestrianism

Fencing

Five fencers, all men, represented Austria in 1988.

Men's foil
 Benny Wendt
 Anatol Richter

Men's épée
 Arno Strohmeyer
 Johannes Nagele
 Axel Birnbaum

Judo

Modern pentathlon

One male pentathlete represented Austria in 1988.

Men's Individual Competition:
 Helmut Spannagl — 4833 pts (→ 36th place)

Men's Team Competition:
 Spannagl — 4833 pts (→ 23rd place)

Rhythmic gymnastics

Rowing

Sailing

Men

Open

Shooting

Men

Women

Open

Swimming

Men's 50m Freestyle
 Markus Opatril
 Heat — 24.32 (→ did not advance, 36th place)
 Alexander Pilhatsch
 Heat — 24.42 (→ did not advance, 38th place)

Men's 100m Freestyle
 Markus Opatril
 Heat — 52.66 (→ did not advance, 41st place)
 Stefan Opatril
 Heat — DSQ (→ did not advance, no ranking)

Men's 200m Freestyle
 Alesander Placheta
 Heat — 1:56.11 (→ did not advance, 41st place)

Men's 100m Breaststroke
 Thomas Böhm
 Heat — 1:04.96 (→ did not advance, 29th place)

Men's 200m Breaststroke
 Thomas Böhm
 Heat — 2:24.15 (→ did not advance, 34th place)

Men's 100m Butterfly
 Reinhold Leitner
 Heat — 56.72 (→ did not advance, 29th place)

Men's 200m Butterfly
 Reinhold Leitner
 Heat — 2:02.18 (→ did not advance, 18th place)

Men's 4 × 100 m Freestyle Relay
 Stefan Opatril, Markus Opatril, Alesander Placheta, and Alexander Pilhatsch
 Heat — DSQ (→ did not advance, no ranking)

Table tennis

Tennis

Women's Singles Competition
 Barbara Paulus
 First Round – Defeated Bettina Fulco (Argentina) 7-6 6-4 
 Second Round – Defeated Jana Novotná (Czechoslovakia) 6-4 6-3
 Third Round – Lost to Zina Garrison (USA) 5-7 2-6

Weightlifting

Wrestling

References

Nations at the 1988 Summer Olympics
1988
Summer Olympics